Ergoldsbach is a municipality in Bavaria, about 20 km north of Landshut and 80 km northeast of Munich in Germany.

Geography 
Ergoldsbach is surrounded by many thick forests, in the hill country of the Landshut region, in Lower Bavaria. A protruding point is the Kapellenberg ("chapel hill") nearly 500 m (1600 ft.) above sea level. On the top of the wooded hill lies an old chapel. In Ergoldsbach, there is a small brook called Goldbach (from there: Ergoldsbach).  Altogether the municipality covers an area of over 57 km² and maintains a road network of 98 km in total length.

The municipality of Ergoldsbach consists of the additional localities and townships of:
 Dürrenhettenbach
 Iffelkofen
 Jellenkofen
 Kläham
 Langenhettenbach
 Leonhardshaun
 Martinshaun
 Oberdörnbach
 Osterhaun
 Paindlkofen
 Prinkofen
 Siegensdorf
 Unterdörnbach
 Wölflkofen

As well as the  settlements of Frauenwies, Haselwies, Kienoden, Reicherstetten, Stocka.

History 

The first mention of Ergoldsbach in writing dates back to 822. The land belonged to the Landshut  and the District Court of Teisbach in the electorate of Bavaria.  At this time, Ergoldsbach had its own market court with a magistrate.  Resulting from its location along the Landshut–Regensburg road, it developed through trade with the farming population.  In the year 1403 it became a Municipality with Market town rights.  Later on, some fires changed the town forever.  In 1860 the Erlus brickworks were established, along with the opening of a railway line from Landshut to Geiselhöring, which resulted in an economic boom for the town.  After a fire, the Erlus factory relocated its head office to Neufahrn nearby.  All that remained in Ergoldsbach was the chimney.  In 1913 a hospital was built in Ergoldsbach, which operated until 1977. After this it was used by the Red Cross, until conversion into a nursing home for seniors in 2004.

Incorporation 
The Market town/municipality Ergoldsbach was founded between 1972-1978 by incorporating Prinkofen, Langenhettenbach, Paindlkofen, Kläham and Martinshaun.

Events leading to the rescue of KZ prisoners 1945 
In April 1945, policeman Max Maurer of the SS was delivered with 13 Jewish KZ prisoners, allegedly with the order to shoot them.  Maurer took the prisoners to the property of Anna Gnadl, where a day later they were recovered by the American advancement.  According to John Weiner, one of the 13, Maurer saved the prisoners' lives.  This was recognised in 1997, when Yad Vashem of Israel presented the Righteous among the Nations award.

Infrastructure 
Ergoldsbach is on the Munich–Regensburg railway line and is served by Agilis and Deutsche Bahn. The Bundesstraße 15, an important federal highway, also runs through the town. In the near future a new road with four lanes is planned to reduce the traffic load on the marketplace in the town's center.  The town belongs to the water authority of Rottenburg.

Development 

 In 2007, the area owned by the Stiegler and Ziegler families was developed into a new centre.  With the demolition of Fassadenbaus, space was created for a supermarket and car park. In Jellenkofen there is a business park with a total area of 39.000 m². Furthermore, residential building areas are available on the Kapellenberg. A secondary school in the nearby Ergolding, established in 2013, gives the municipality of Ergoldsbach a boost.

Facilities

Education and Youth 
 Ergoldsbach Kindergarten with branches in Ergoldsbach and Kläham.
 Ergoldsbach Verbandsschule with a Grundschule (primary school) and a Hauptschule (secondary school), which has recently been completely refurbished.
 Ergoldsbach Jugendtreff (youth club) next to the Werk II Plaza.

Entertainment 
 The Goldbach Hall, a sports and multipurpose hall with the capacity to seat 1000 spectators.

Sports and Leisure 
 The new Ergoldsbach sports centre was opened on July 16, 2004.
 Ergoldsbach has two beach volleyball courts (in Kläham and Jellenkofen) and a number of football ovals.
 Ergoldsbach also has an outdoor public swimming pool.
 A skate park is being planned.
 There is also a tennis club located in Ergoldsbach, called the TCE.  It has its own club house with 6 tennis courts (sand).

Fire Brigade 
In and around the municipality of Ergoldsbach there are several Freiwillige Feuerwehren (volunteer fire departments):

FF Ergoldsbach; FF Kläham; FF Langenhettenbach; FF Martinshaun; FF Paindlkofen; FF Prinkofen.

Religion
 About 75% of the Ergoldsbach population are Catholic.  The parish church St. Peter and Paul (Ergoldsbach) is located near the town centre.  The smaller church or chapel of the region is also located in Ergoldsbach (Agatha Chapel).
 About 7% of the Ergoldsbach population are Lutheran.  The circa 1970 church is located at the recreation area on Badstraße ('bath road').   The service alternates between the aforementioned Ergoldsbach church and the Friedenskirche ('peace church') in Neufahrn.
 An increasing proportion of the Ergoldsbach population now belongs to Islam.

Economy
First and foremost, Ergoldsbach is a commuter community.  A large proportion of the population travel every day to Landshut, Munich, Dingolfing and Regensburg.  In Ergoldsbach itself, is the Erlus corporation among other companies.  There a variety of supermarkets, two bakeries with outlets in Neufahrn, Essenbach, Landshut, etc. and other small businesses.

Clubs 
In Ergoldsbach and its surroundings, there are about 60 fairly large clubs.

Twin Towns and Sister Cities 
 In the year 2004 a partnership was established with the Italian city Montefiascone.
 Ergoldsbach is a partner of the municipality Ergolding.

Books about Ergoldsbach 
 Roger DEVAUX : Treize Qu'ils Etaient - Life of the French prisoners of war at the peasants of low Bavaria (1939–1945) -  Treize Qu'ils Etaient - Mémoires et Cultures - 2007 -

References

External links
 www.vgem-ergoldsbach.de  - Municipality Ergoldsbach (only in German)
 www.markt-ergoldsbach.de - information portal (only in German)

Landshut (district)
The Holocaust in Germany